Dya-Eddine Said Bamakhrama, born in the Republic of Djibouti on November 8, 1966, is the ambassador extraordinary and plenipotentiary of the Republic of Djibouti to the Kingdom of Saudi Arabia and has been Djibouti’s permanent representative to the Organization of Islamic Cooperation (OIC) since 2002. Further, he has been the Dean of the Diplomatic Corps accredited to the Kingdom of Saudi Arabia 2013 and 
political analyst Djiboutian.

Honours 
He was awarded the National Order of Independence on June 27,the rank of commander in 2017.

References 

Ambassadors of Djibouti to Saudi Arabia
1966 births
Living people